Anne Boixel (12 April 1965 in Rennes) is a French slalom canoeist who competed from the mid-1980s to the late 1990s. She won six medals at the ICF Canoe Slalom World Championships with three golds (K1 team: 1989, 1993, 1995) and three silvers (K1: 1993, 1995; K1 team: 1997).

Boixel also competed in two Summer Olympics, earning her best finish of sixth in the K1 event in Atlanta in 1996.

World Cup individual podiums

References
ICF medalists for Olympic and World Championships - Part 2: rest of flatwater (now sprint) and remaining canoeing disciplines: 1936-2007.

1965 births
Canoeists at the 1992 Summer Olympics
Canoeists at the 1996 Summer Olympics
French female canoeists
Living people
Olympic canoeists of France
Sportspeople from Rennes
Medalists at the ICF Canoe Slalom World Championships
20th-century French women